Relevant is something directly related, connected or pertinent to a topic; it may also mean something that is current.

Relevant may also refer to: 

 Relevant operator, a concept in physics, see renormalization group
 Relevant, Ain, a commune of the Ain département in France
 Relevant Magazine, a bimonthly Christian magazine

See also
 The philosophical concept of relevance
 Relevance (disambiguation)